A Consular Commission is a document that a government issues to nominate an honorary consul in a different country. The consular commission is usually issued by the Ministry of Foreign Affairs (or comparable department) of the state nominating the consul. Based on the nomination, the receiving state may or may not issue an exequatur - accepting the consul.

According to the Vienna Convention on Consular Relations: "Consular Commission certifies a consul's capacity and showing, as a general rule, his full name, his category and class, the consular district and the seat of the consular post. The sending State shall transmit the commission or similar instrument through the diplomatic or other appropriate channel to the Government of the State in whose territory the head of a consular post is to exercise his functions. If the receiving State agrees, the sending State may, instead of a
commission or similar instrument, send to the receiving State a notification containing the particulars" of the person nominated.

References

External links

Consular affairs
Foreign policy